The Ten Commandments is a 2007  computer-animated biblical epic film directed by John Stronach and Bill Boyce. The film was released by Promenade Pictures. The film follows Moses from his childhood, as the adopted grandson of Pharaoh, to his adulthood, as the chosen one of Yahweh and liberator of his people.

With narration by Ben Kingsley, the film stars Christian Slater as Moses, Alfred Molina as Ramses and Ellott Gould as God. It was released to theaters on October 19, 2007, and received mostly negative reviews, with criticism directed towards the animation, screenplay, plot, voice acting and inaccuracies to the Bible. It was also a box office failure, having grossed only $1 million against a budget of $10 million.

Plot
The Pharaoh is a nervous man, outnumbered by his Hebrew slaves; he orders them to be worked harder, that doesn't break their spirits, so he has all the newborn male babies thrown into the Nile; Moses' parents, Amram and Jochebed, are desperate to save their baby son, and put him in a basket and send him down the river while his sister, Miram, follows to make sure he's okay. The next morning, the Pharaoh's daughter adopts and raises him as her own, with Jochebed as his nurse growing up. His playmate and uncle is Ramses, the Pharaoh's son. As teens, they wrestle, but Ramses does not like Moses much, and Moses is exiled from town after Moses comes to the aid of a slave being beaten, and the beater is killed. Moses is mistaken for a Hebrew slave based on his appearance. His brother Aaron comes forward, revealing his past and how they are actually brothers-making Moses a Hebrew.

They all grow up, Ramses is now Pharaoh, God speaks to Moses, telling him to get the Hebrews from Egypt into the promised land. Ramses says no, the ten plagues come, and Ramses gives in only when his son is killed (as God's spirit kills all the first-born Egyptian sons). Moses leads the people from Egypt, ditches Ramses and his army at the parting of the Red Sea, and Moses receives the Ten Commandments and delivers them to the Hebrews. Moses puts Joshua in charge of leading the people the rest of the way.

Cast

Ben Kingsley as the Narrator
Christian Slater as Moses
Alfred Molina as Ramses
Elliott Gould as God
Scott McNeil as Seti
Christopher Gaze as Aaron
Kathleen Barr as Miriam
Lee Tockar as Dathan
Matt Hill as Joshua
Tabitha St. Germain (credited as "Kitanou St. Germain") as the Princess
Trevor Devall as Amram
Jane Mortifee as Zipporah
Brian Dobson as the Task Master
Garry Chalk as the General
Nico Ghisi as Ramses' Son
Colin Murdock as the Elderly Slave

Box office
The film opened in 830 theaters in the United States and grossed $478,910 on its opening weekend. Brandon Gray of Box Office Mojo wrote that it and Sarah Landon and the Paranormal Hour had "two of the worst national debuts of all time". The film ended up grossing $952,820 in the United States and $99,087 elsewhere, for a total of $1,051,907.

Reception
The Ten Commandments received mostly negative reviews from critics. According to the review aggregator website Rotten Tomatoes, 18% of critics have given the film a positive review based on 22 reviews, with an average rating of 3.99/10. The site's critics consensus reads, "The Ten Commandments proves that not even one of humanity's most enduring tales is strong enough to overcome a biblical plague of cheap-looking animation." At Metacritic, the film has a weighted average score of 25 out of 100 based on 6 critics, indicating "generally unfavorable reviews".

Joe Ledyon of Variety gave a negative review, calling it "a well-intentioned misfire featuring 3-D CGI animation that recalls lesser vidgames of the mid-1990s". Keith Phipps of The A.V. Club wrote that it "fails on every conceivable level" and "seems to have been made using public-domain software, and targeted squarely at kids impressed by any brightly colored moving objects".

Roger Moore of the Orlando Sentinel was also critical, writing "a big-name voice cast doesn't cover for a script that may hit the Biblical high points but somehow misses the dramatic heart of the story", and that "the filmmakers certainly could have used a little Veggie Tales humor". Lou Carlozo of the Chicago Tribune was more positive, stating "There's an endearing, earnest quality to The Ten Commandments that transcends its star-studded cast and computer-generated animation".

References

External links
 
 
 
 
 
 
 
 Animation Magazine article

2007 films
English-language Canadian films
Films based on the Book of Exodus
Films set in ancient Egypt
Films set in the 13th century BC
Films about Christianity
Fiction about God
2007 computer-animated films
American computer-animated films
Ten Commandments
Portrayals of Moses in film
2000s American animated films
2000s English-language films